Ken Burns (1923 – 2006) was a Manx footballer, who played as a winger in the Football League for Tranmere Rovers.

References

External links

Tranmere Rovers F.C. players
Southport F.C. players
Association football wingers
English Football League players
Manx footballers
1923 births
2006 deaths